The Kamundan River is a river in southern West Papua province, Indonesia. Kamundan is mostly still natural with the upstream in Manokwari Regency and river mouth at the border of Bintuni Bay and Sorong Selatan Regency. It is also known as the "Sungai Kamundan".

Geography
The river flows in the southern area of West Papua with predominantly tropical rainforest climate (designated as Af in the Köppen-Geiger climate classification). The annual average temperature in the area is 24 °C. The warmest month is January, when the average temperature is around 26 °C, and the coldest is February, at 22 °C. The average annual rainfall is 3744 mm. The wettest month is June, with an average of 484 mm rainfall, and the driest is October, with 153 mm rainfall.

Ecology 
The Kamundan River has many trees on both banks as well as clear and calm water. Some species can be found around this river including saltwater crocodiles, primates, a variety of hornbills, yellow-crested cockatoo, dan bats.

See also
List of rivers of Indonesia
List of rivers of Western New Guinea

References

Rivers of West Papua (province)
Rivers of Indonesia